Koratala Siva (born 15 June 1975) is an Indian film director and screenwriter who works in Telugu cinema. Koratala has directed action drama  films such as Mirchi (2013), Srimanthudu (2015), Janatha Garage (2016), Bharat Ane Nenu (2018) and Acharya (2022). He has received two Nandi Awards and an IIFA Utsavam Award for his directional works.

Early life and start-up career
Born into a family of social activists with communist ideologies, he began his early career working in the information technology industry as a software engineer. He then worked as a screenwriting assistant for films under his uncle, Posani Krishna Murali. Subsequently, he ventured into Telugu film industry as a dialogue writer for films such as Okkadunnadu, Munna, Brindavanam, and Oosaravelli.

Film directorial career
In 2013, he made his film directorial debut with Mirchi starring Prabhas which was a box-office success. In 2015, he directed action-drama film Srimanthudu, which was a commercial success, and has received three Filmfare Awards South, six IIFA Awards, and six SIIMA Awards.

His 2016 film Janatha Garage starred Mohanlal and N. T. Rama Rao Jr. The story follows operating a large automobile service center named "Janatha Garage" and undertaking law enforcement through their group of automobile mechanics, because the legal agencies were thought to be inadequate. The film grossed estimated 135 crore and earned a distributor's share amount of 60 crore in its first week of release. Koratala scored his third consecutive success as a director with the film. He returned to direct actor Mahesh Babu in the political action drama film Bharat Ane Nenu and continued his success streak at the box-office, with the film grossing 225 crore at the box-office.

In early 2020, Koratala started filming his next directional, Acharya with Chiranjeevi and Ram Charan in the lead. The film, released in April 2022, received negative reviews and ended up as the poorest performing film at the box office in Koratala's career.

Koratala is also signed to direct a film with NTR Jr and its second time collaboration among with them. The film was produce under the banner N. T. R. Arts and Yuvasudha Arts; it's a first film for this production. On the occasion of Jr NTR's birthday, the makers released a motion poster titled NTR 30.  The shoot is expected to begin in July 2022, following which he would team up with actor Allu Arjun for their next project.

Public image
Koratala watched Vaarasudu Telugu film and applauded the team for its grandeur and emotions.

Filmography

Frequent collaborators

Awards

References

External links

Living people
21st-century Indian film directors
Telugu film directors
1975 births
Telugu screenwriters
Indian male screenwriters
Film directors from Andhra Pradesh
Screenwriters from Andhra Pradesh
21st-century Indian dramatists and playwrights
21st-century Indian male writers
21st-century Indian screenwriters
People from Andhra Pradesh
People from Guntur district
Indian film directors
Filmfare Awards South winners
South Indian International Movie Awards winners
International Indian Film Academy Awards winners
Santosham Film Awards winners
Zee Cine Awards Telugu winners